The 2021–22 Bucknell Bison men's basketball team represented Bucknell University in the 2021–22 NCAA Division I men's basketball season. The Bison, led by seventh-year head coach Nathan Davis, played their home games at Sojka Pavilion in Lewisburg, Pennsylvania as members of the Patriot League.

Previous season
In a season limited due to the ongoing COVID-19 pandemic, the Bison finished the 2020–21 season 5–7, 4–6 in Patriot League play to finish in second place in the Central Division. As the No. 6 seed in the Patriot League tournament, they upset Lafayette in the quarterfinals, before losing to eventual tournament champions Colgate in the semifinals.

Roster

Schedule and results

|-
!colspan=12 style=| Non-conference regular season

|-
!colspan=12 style=| Patriot League regular season

|-
!colspan=9 style=| Patriot League tournament

Sources

References

Bucknell Bison men's basketball seasons
Bucknell Bison
Bucknell Bison men's basketball
Bucknell Bison men's basketball